Henry Selby Hele-Shaw FRS (1854–1941) was an English mechanical and automobile engineer. He was the inventor of the variable-pitch propeller, which contributed to British success in the Battle of Britain in 1940, and he experimented with flows through thin cells. Flows through such configurations are named in his honour (Hele-Shaw flows). He was also a co-founder of Victaulic.

Life
Born on 29 July 1854 at Billericay, he was the eldest son of Henry Shaw (1825 – 1880), a lawyer who went bankrupt, and his wife Marion Selby Hele (1834 – 1891), daughter of the Reverend Henry Selby Hele, vicar of Grays Thurrock and grandson of the Reverend George Horne. He was first articled at the age of 17 to Messrs Rouch and Leaker, at the Mardyke Engineering Works, Bristol and served an engineering apprenticeship until 1876. Hele-Shaw was also elected a Whitworth Scholar.

He was the first Professor of Engineering at University College, Bristol, and in 1885 became the first to hold the Harrison Chair of Engineering at Liverpool University College and was also a Fellow of the Royal Society.

In 1923 Hele-Shaw founded the Whitworth Society and was the Society's first President. The Whitworth Society still exists and provides an informal contact between all ages of Whitworth Scholar and a means to promote engineering in the UK. The aim of the society is to bring closer those who have benefited from Sir Joseph Whitworth's generosity.

He was awarded the Franklin Institute's Certificate of Merit in 1933.

He died on 30 January 1941 at Ross-on-Wye.

Lectures
In 1902 Hele-Shaw was invited to deliver the Royal Institution Christmas Lecture Locomotion : On the Earth, Through the Water, in the Air.

See also 
 Hele-Shaw clutch
 Victaulic

References

1854 births
1941 deaths
Fluid dynamicists
English mechanical engineers
Fellows of the Royal Society
People from Billericay